Alain Sánchez Machado  (born March 30, 1986) is a Cuban professional baseball pitcher for Naranjas de Villa Clara in the Cuban National Series.

Sánchez played for the Cuba national baseball team at the 2004 World Junior Baseball Championship and 2017 World Baseball Classic.

References

External links

1986 births
Living people
People from Cifuentes, Cuba
Cuban baseball players
Baseball pitchers
Naranjas de Villa Clara players
Tigres de Ciego de Avila players
2017 World Baseball Classic players